Le Monde diplomatique (meaning "The Diplomatic World" and shortened as le Diplo in French) is a French monthly newspaper founded in 1954 offering analysis and opinion on politics, culture, and current affairs.  there are 31 editions (7 digital-only) in 22 other languages worldwide.

The publication is 51% owned by Le Monde diplomatique SA, a subsidiary company of Le Monde which grants it complete editorial autonomy.

History

1954–1989
Le Monde diplomatique was founded in 1954 by Hubert Beuve-Méry, founder and director of Le Monde, the French newspaper of record. Subtitled the "organ of diplomatic circles and of large international organisations," 5,000 copies were distributed, comprising eight pages, dedicated to foreign policy and geopolitics. Its first editor in chief, developed the newspaper as a scholarly reference journal. Honti attentively followed the birth of the Non-Aligned Movement, created out of the 1955 Bandung Conference, and the issues of the "Third World".

Claude Julien became the newspaper's second editor in January 1973. At that time, the circulation of Le Monde diplomatique had jumped from 5,000 to 50,000 copies, and would reach, with Micheline Paulet, 120,000 in under 20 years. Without renouncing its "Third-worldism" position, it extended the treatment of its subjects, concentrating on international economic and monetary problems, strategic relations, the Middle-East conflict, etc. One of the contributors was Samir Frangieh, a leftist Lebanese journalist.

Le Monde diplomatique took an independent stance, criticising both the neoliberal ideology of the left and conservative policies represented by UK Prime Minister Margaret Thatcher and US President Ronald Reagan in the 1980s.

1989–present
After the November 1989 Fall of the Berlin Wall following the dissolution of the Soviet Union, and the 1990-1991 Gulf War, the newspaper began to criticise what it described as an "American crusade". Ignacio Ramonet was elected director or editor-in-chief in January 1991, serving until 2008.

Under his leadership, Le Monde diplomatique analysed the post-Cold War world, paying specific attention to "ethnic" conflicts that arose in this period: the wars in former Yugoslavia, the 1994 Rwandan genocide, the conflicts in the Caucasus, etc., as well as to the new information technology.

Ramonet has also published books about the media and their relationship to national societies. As noted by François Cusset, French universities have not developed an interdisciplinary approach to media studies. He notes that leftist journals including Le Monde Diplomatique have had an editorial approach that is committed to "critique of dominant media", both in terms of their roles in setting agendas and in enjoying status perks. Both Ramonet and his successor, Serge Halimi, published books that critiqued the media from outside academic circles.

The newspaper established financial and editorial independence from Le Monde in 1996, forming its own company. Le Monde owns 51%; the Friends of Le Monde diplomatique and Günter Holzmann Association, comprising the paper’s staff, together own 49%.

In an editorial in January 1995, Ignacio Ramonet coined the term "pensée unique" ("single thought") to describe the supremacy of the neoliberal ideology. The newspaper supported the November–December 1995 general strike in France against Prime minister Alain Juppé's (RPR) plan to cut pensions.

Three years later, after a proposal in a 1997 editorial by Ramonet, Le Monde diplomatique took a founding role in the creation of ATTAC, an alter-globalisation NGO. It was founded to advocate the Tobin tax, and chapters have been started throughout the world. It now supports a variety of left-wing causes. The newspaper also took an important role in the organisation of the 2001 Porto Alegre World Social Forum.

After the Second Gulf War, started in 2003 under the George W. Bush administration, Le Monde diplomatique continued to criticise the US policy of "violent intervention" in the Middle East and the neoconservative project to "reshape" the so-called "Greater Middle East" region.

Ramonet devoted considerable space to reporting on Hugo Chávez, with whom he was said to have developed a close relationship, and his Bolivarian Revolution.

Ramonet was succeeded by Serge Halimi who had a PhD in Political Science from the University of California Berkeley. In 2018, LMD publishes a total of 37 print and online editions, in a total of 20 languages.

The August 2017 issue of the monthly was not marketed in Algeria. According to sources close to the distributor, the newspaper did not get permission to do so. Algerian authorities gave no explanation. The heads of the newspaper claim that it was "banned" from sale in the country because of a report by journalist Pierre Daum. He is best known for writing a book about the harkis who stayed in Algeria after Independence, and about the difficult social and economic situation of some young Algerians.

Le Monde diplomatique SA
André Fontaine, the director of Le Monde, signed a 1989 convention with Claude Julien which guaranteed the monthly's autonomy. But it gained complete statutory, economic and financial independence in 1996 with the creation of Le Monde diplomatique SA.

Thus, since the end of 2000, the newspaper's employees and readers retain 49% of Le Monde diplomatique SA'''s capital, largely above the control stock necessary to control the direction and editorial line of the Monde diplo. The remaining 51% is owned by Le Monde.

Controversies
Criticism
Jean-Marie Colombani, former editor of the daily Le Monde, was attributed by Le Monde diplomatiques former director general Bernard Cassen as saying: "Le Monde diplomatique is a journal of opinion; Le Monde is a journal of opinions."

9/11 conspiracy theories
The Norwegian version of the July 2006 Le Monde diplomatique sparked interest when the editors ran, on their own initiative, a three page main story on the September 11, 2001 attacks and summarised the various types of 9/11 conspiracy theories (which were not specifically endorsed by the newspaper, only reviewed).

In December 2006, the French version published an article by Alexander Cockburn, co-editor of CounterPunch, which strongly criticised the endorsement of conspiracy theories by the US left-wing, alleging that it was a sign of "theoretical emptiness." The Norwegian Le Monde diplomatique, did again however mark its difference from the mother edition by allowing David Ray Griffin's response to Cockburn to be published in their March 2007 issue.

Advertising
Although Le Monde diplomatique publishes few advertisements in order to retain its editorial independence, it has sometimes been criticised for the quantity and nature of the published advertisements In November and December 2003, two-page advertisements by IBM and a car manufacturer were placed. The issues of February and March 2004 contained advertisements by Microsoft in a "social" atmosphere with a picture of children, which led to agitation.

Meat AtlasLe Monde diplomatique co-publishes the Meat Atlas, which is an annual report on meat production and consumption.

Overseas
The Friends of Le Monde diplomatique'' are a London-based society that promotes the English edition. It organises regular talks at The Gallery in Cowcross Street, Farringdon.

References

External links

French edition and at Exact Editions with trial issue
 The French edition is accessible from 1954 to 1977 in Gallica, the digital library of the BnF

1954 establishments in France
Alter-globalization
Monthly newspapers
Multilingual news services
Newspapers published in Paris
Publications established in 1954
Socialist newspapers